Micromonospora coxensis is an endophytic actinomycete first isolated from sandy soil in Bangladesh; it produces single, non-motile nodular spore surfaces.

References

External links

LPSN
Type strain of Micromonospora coxensis at BacDive -  the Bacterial Diversity Metadatabase

Micromonosporaceae
Bacteria described in 2007